William McFarlane (1 October 1923 – October 1998) was a Scottish footballer, who played for Bathgate Thistle, Hearts, Stirling Albion, Kilmarnock and Inverness Caledonian. McFarlane represented Scotland once, in a 6–0 victory against Luxembourg in May 1947. McFarlane was born in Fallin, Stirling on 1 October 1923, and died in Stirling in October 1998, at the age of 75.

References

Sources

External links
London Hearts profile (Scottish League)

1923 births
1998 deaths
Footballers from Stirling (council area)
Scottish footballers
Association football wingers
Bathgate Thistle F.C. players
Heart of Midlothian F.C. players
Stirling Albion F.C. players
Kilmarnock F.C. players
Caledonian F.C. players
Scottish Football League players
Scotland international footballers
Scottish Football League representative players
Date of death missing